The Brown Fellowship Society (1790-1945), which became the Century Fellowship Society, was an African-American self-help organization in South Carolina. It eventually became the Century Fellowship Society.

History 
The Brown Fellowship Society was founded in Charleston, South Carolina in 1790 with the motto “Charity and Benevolence”. It was founded by five free non-whites who attended St. Philip’s Episcopal Church: James Mitchell, George Bampfield, William Cattel, George Bedon, and Samuel Saltus. It was founded “to provide benefits which the white church denied them like a proper burial ground, widow and orphan care, and assistance in times of sickness”. The group’s cemetery was an important part of its function. Those who joined the club considered themselves “brown”, mulattoes, an important distinction at the time when society in Charleston recognized three races: White, Mulatto, and Negro, including octoroons and quadroons.

Unlike some mutual self-help organization in the African-American community, the Brown Society was not linked to any church, even banning discussion of religion. Many of the members of the Brown Fellowship Society had their own businesses and some were prosperous. In 1843, another group was formed by African American men in Charleston, the Humane Brotherhood, modeled after the Brown Fellowship Society, but less class conscious.

The Brown Fellowship Society did not intervene in the status of slaves at the time. The organization was focused on creating a cemetery for "brown" black people. The Society was able to buy a ground for the cemetery and a meeting house. The Society had merely 50 members. Each had to pay a $50 membership fee, and went through three different votes before being admitted. The organization forbid talks about political or religious matters. The organization also cared for widows of members, provided a primary school, supported its members' businesses, and lobbied towards the white society.

"After the Civil War, the Brown Fellowship Society expanded to include more African Americans, including women and those of darker skin".

In 1892, The Society was renamed the Century Fellowship Society.

In 1943, the city of Charleston passed an ordinance prohibiting private organizations from maintaining graveyards. The Century Fellowship Society sold the original BFS cemetery in 1945 to Bishop England High School, and the Society was officially dissolved.

For many years afterwards, the Catholic Diocese kept affirming that the cemetery had been cleared of corpses, but in 2001, four gravesites were discovered when the construction of the College of Charleston's Addlestone Library was launched. The whole cemetery was paved over. The records of the society are held at the Avery Research Center for African American History and Culture.

Brotherly Society 

In 1843, the free black man Thomas Smalls applied for a membership in the Brown Fellowship Society and was turned down because he was too black. He set up his own society, The Society for Free Blacks of Dark Complexion (later renamed the Brotherly Society). He opened a graveyard for pure African descent, the MacPhelah cemetery, adjacent to the Brown Fellowship Graveyard, and another one, Ephrath (still intact today).

References

Further reading
Brown, Tamara L., Gregory S. Parks, and Clarenda M. Phillips, eds. African American fraternities and sororities: The legacy and the vision. University Press of Kentucky, 2012.
Browning, James B. "The beginnings of insurance enterprise among Negroes." The Journal of Negro History 22.4 (1937): 417-432.
Fitchett, E. Horace. "The Status of the Free Negro in Charleston, South Carolina, and His Descendants in Modern Society: Statement of the Problem." The Journal of Negro History 32.4 (1947): 430-451.
Fitchett, E. Horace. "The Traditions of the Free Negro in Charleston, South Carolina." The Journal of Negro History 25.2 (1940): 139-152.
Gatewood, Willard B. "Aristocrats of Color: South and North The Black Elite, 1880-1920." The Journal of Southern History 54.1 (1988): 3-20.
Greenbaum, Susan D. "A comparison of African American and Euro-American mutual aid societies in 19th century America." The Journal of Ethnic Studies 19.3 (1991): 95.
Harris, Robert L. "Charleston's Free Afro-American Elite: The Brown Fellowship Society and the Humane Brotherhood." The South Carolina Historical Magazine 82.4 (1981): 289-310.
Harris, Robert L. "Early black benevolent societies, 1780-1830." The Massachusetts Review 20.3 (1979): 603-625.
Thomas, Richard W. "The Historical Roots of Contemporary Urban Black Self-Help in the United States." Contemporary urban America: problems, issues, and alternatives (1991): 253.

External links 
 Inventory of the Brown Fellowship Society, 1794 - 1990

African-American history in Charleston, South Carolina
Service organizations based in the United States